A purchase journal is a specialised accounting journal and it is also a prime entry book/daybook/main entry book which is used in an accounting system to keep track of the orders of items placed using accounts payable.

Simply a purchase journal can be defined as the main entry book which is used to record credit transactions (credit purchases) for resalable purposes.

The Source document which is used as an evidence in recording transactions into purchase journal is Purchase invoice.

Credit purchase of current assets/Non current assets are not considered when recording in Purchase journal.

Double entry related to credit purchase for resalable purpose 

Purchase a/c Debit
Creditors a/c Credit

See also 
 Sales journal
 General journal
 Bookkeeping
 Special journals

References 

 
Accounting journals and ledgers
Accounts payable